Cardamine diphylla (broadleaf toothwort, crinkle root, crinkle-root, crinkleroot, pepper root, twin-leaved toothwort, twoleaf toothwort, toothwort) is a plant native to North America.

Cardamine diphylla is a spring woodland plant that is found in most of eastern North America.

Description
A member of the mustard family, it is typified by a four petal flower which blooms in a cluster on a single stalk above a single pair of toothed stem leaves each divided into three broad leaflets. After flowering, narrow seedpods appear just below the flower cluster. It grows approximately 30 cm (12 in) tall.

Distribution
Its habitat ranges from Georgia north to Ontario and from the Atlantic to Wisconsin. It is found in moist woodlands usually in edge habitats and blooms from April to June.

Butterfly habitat
The West Virginia white butterfly (Pieris virginiensis) lays its eggs on this plant as well as C. laciniata. The larvae also feed on this plant. As with Pieris oleracea, Pieris virginiensis mistakes garlic mustard for its host plants, making eradication of it important for their continued survival. Garlic mustard also competes with the plants for space and nutrients.

Use by Native Americans

Medicinal
The ground root is mixed with vinegar by the Algonquin people of Quebec and used as a relish. They also give an infusion to children to treat fevers, and use an infusion of the plant and sweet flag root to treat heart disease. The Cherokee use a poultice of the root for headaches, chew the root for colds and gargle an infusion for sore throats. The Lenape use the roots as a stomach medicine, and use an infusion of the roots combined with other plants as a treatment for scrofula and venereal disease. The Delaware Nation of Oklahoma use a compound containing the root as a stomach remedy, for scrofula, and for venereal disease.

The Iroquois take an infusion of the whole plant to strengthen the breasts. They also chew the raw root for stomach gas, apply a poultice of roots to swellings, take a cold infusion of the plant for fever and for "summer complaint, drink a cold infusion of the roots for "when love is too strong", and use an infusion of the roots when  "heart jumps and the head goes wrong." They also use a compound for chest pains. They also take an infusion of the plant at the beginning of tuberculosis. The Malecite use an infusion of the roots as a tonic, and chew green or dried roots for hoarseness. The Micmac use the root as a sedative, to clear the throat and for hoarseness, and use the root as a tonic.

Culinary
The Abenaki use it as a condiment. The Cherokee parboil and rinse the stems and leaves, add hot grease, salt & water & boiled them until they are soft as potherbs. They also use the leaves in salads, and smoke the plant. The Iroquois eat the roots raw with salt or boiled. The Ojibwa mix the roots with salt, vinegar, or sugar and use them as a condiment.

Notes

References
Wood, Alphonso (1870) New American Botanist and Florist, revised and edited by Oliver R Willis. American Book Company Publishers, 1889.

External links
USDA Plants Profile: Cardamine diphylla
Evergreen NPDB, Toothwort

diphylla
Ephemeral plants
Flora of West Virginia
Flora of the Great Lakes region (North America)
Flora of the Eastern United States
Butterfly food plants
Plants used in Native American cuisine
Plants used in traditional Native American medicine
Flora of Alabama
Flora of Connecticut
Flora without expected TNC conservation status